Max Ibel (1 January 1896 – 19 March 1981) is credited as one of the creators of the Luftwaffe. He was also a recipient of the Knight's Cross of the Iron Cross.

Career

Max Ibel was born in 1896 in Munich and joined the Army as a cadet in July 1915, serving with the 1st Bavarian Pioneer battalion, and was commissioned as an officer  in August 1916.

When the war ended he remained in the German Army, serving with the First Engineer Battalion in Munich, becoming adjutant in mid 1919. In July 1928 he left the Army for pilot training at the Lipetsk fighter-pilot school in the Soviet Union, where Luftwaffe aircrew were secretly trained.

After returning to Germany, in May 1932 Ibel was promoted to Hauptmann, and served as an Instructor with the flight school (Jagdfliegerschule) in Schleissheim.

In November 1935 he was promoted to Major.

In May 1936, he was transferred to command Jagdgeschwader 134 in Dortmund.
From December 1936 to February 1937, Ibel commanded the I. Gruppe of Jagdgeschwader 232 in Bernburg and in March commanded I./Jagdgeschwader 135.

In November 1938, he was commander of Jagdgeschwader 231 which was later renamed Jagdgeschwader 3.

Ibel then was Geschwaderkommodore of the new Jagdgeschwader 27 (JG 27), and led JG 27 successfully during the Battle of France and the Battle of Britain until October 1940. He received the Knight's Cross of the Iron Cross on 22 August 1940.

In October 1940, Oberst Ibel became Kommandeur of Jagdfliegerschule 4 (Fighter Pilot School), where he remained until June 1941, when he was promoted to Generalmajor, and appointed Jagdfliegerführer 3 (Jafü 3) in occupied France. In February 1942 Ibel acted as liaison officer with the Kriegsmarine during the Channel Dash when the Luftwaffe provided effective air cover over the battle cruisers Scharnhorst and Gneisenau, and heavy cruiser Prinz Eugen passage through the English Channel.

In December 1942, he became the Jagdfliegerführer West, and in October 1943 assumed command of 2. Jagd-Division, located in northern Germany.
During the last two years of the War Ibel was commander of 2. Jagd-Division and at the very end of the War he became Inspector of Jet operations.

After time as a POW with the Western Allies, Ibel was released in 1948. He rejoined the German Air Force in October 1957 as a Brigadier General.

Awards

 Knight's Cross of the Iron Cross on 22 August 1940 as Oberst and Geschwaderkommodore of JG 27

References

Citations

Bibliography

 
 
 
 

1896 births
1981 deaths
Luftwaffe World War II generals
Bundeswehr generals
German World War II pilots
German Army personnel of World War I
Military personnel from Munich
People from the Kingdom of Bavaria
Recipients of the Knight's Cross of the Iron Cross
Burials at Munich Waldfriedhof
Brigadier generals of the German Air Force
Major generals of the Luftwaffe